The Coos County Logging Museum is museum in located in Myrtle Point, Oregon, United States. The museum's focus is the historical forest products industry, particularly logging specific to the local area of Coos County which is situated among vast forest preserves. The museum, a non-profit educational institution, is staffed entirely by volunteers, many of whom hail from the logging camps themselves.

The museum building is a shingled dome modeled after the Mormon Tabernacle in Salt Lake City, Utah. The building was listed on the National Register of Historic Places in 1979.

See also
National Register of Historic Places listings in Coos County, Oregon

References

External links 
 Coos County Logging Museum - City of Myrtle Point

Museums in Coos County, Oregon
Forestry museums in the United States
Industry museums in Oregon
National Register of Historic Places in Coos County, Oregon